Mujeres Asesinas ("Killer Women") can mean:
 Mujeres asesinas (Argentine TV series), an Argentine TV series
 Mujeres asesinas (Mexican TV series), a Mexican TV series based on the above
 Killer Women, an American TV series based on the above